Ptenopus kochi, also known as the interdune barking gecko, Koch's barking gecko, or Koch's chirping gecko, is a species of gecko endemic to Namibia.

References 

Endemic fauna of Namibia
Ptenopus
Reptiles of Namibia
Reptiles described in 1964